The Dock of the Bay is the first of a number of posthumously released Otis Redding albums, and his seventh studio album. It contains a number of singles and B-sides dating back to 1965, as well as one of his best known songs, the posthumous hit "(Sittin' On) The Dock of the Bay". Recording of the album finished just two days before Redding's death in a plane crash on December 10, 1967. In 2003, the album was ranked number 161 on Rolling Stone magazine's list of the 500 greatest albums of all time, maintaining the rating in a 2012 revised list.

Track listing

Notes 

 Tracks 1–4, 6, 7 & 9 are unreleased. 
 Track 5 was the B-side to "My Lover's Prayer" in 1966.
 Track 8 is from King & Queen (1967).
 Track 10 is from The Soul Album (1966).
 Track 11 is from Otis Blue (1965).

Personnel
Otis Redding – vocals
Booker T. Jones – keyboards, piano
Isaac Hayes – keyboards, piano
Steve Cropper – guitar
Donald Dunn – bass guitar
Al Jackson Jr. – drums
Wayne Jackson – trumpet
Joe Arnold – tenor saxophone
Carla Thomas - vocals on "Tramp"

Charts

Album

Singles

Certifications

References

External links
 Album Lyrics

Otis Redding albums
Albums produced by Steve Cropper
Compilation albums published posthumously
1968 compilation albums
Atco Records compilation albums
Stax Records compilation albums